John Whiting (died after 1430) of Shaftesbury, Dorset, was an English Member of Parliament and lawyer.

He was a Member (MP) of the Parliament of England for Shaftesbury in 1391 and 1395.

References

14th-century births
15th-century deaths
English MPs 1391
People from Shaftesbury
English MPs 1395